Jörg van Essen (born 29 September 1947 in Burscheid, North Rhine-Westphalia) is a German politician  of the Free Democratic Party (FDP) in the Bundestag.

Van Essen was born in Burscheid and attended a gymnasium in Siegen. He studied law at the University of Cologne from 1968 to 1973. After he finished university he became a prosecutor in Münster, Hagen and Dortmund from 1976 to 1985. Since 1980, van Essen has been a member of the Free Democratic Party and from 1990 to 2013 he was a member of the Bundestag.

Van Essen is openly gay.

Awards and decorations
 2007: Bundeswehr Cross of Honour in Gold
 2013: Great Cross of Merit of the Federal Republic of Germany

References

External links

1947 births
Living people
People from Burscheid
University of Cologne alumni
Gay politicians
Members of the Bundestag for North Rhine-Westphalia
German prosecutors
LGBT members of the Bundestag
Recipients of the Badge of Honour of the Bundeswehr
Commanders Crosses of the Order of Merit of the Federal Republic of Germany
Members of the Bundestag 2009–2013
Members of the Bundestag 2005–2009
Members of the Bundestag 2002–2005
Members of the Bundestag 1998–2002
Members of the Bundestag 1994–1998
Members of the Bundestag 1990–1994
Members of the Bundestag for the Free Democratic Party (Germany)